Raya is a fictional character who serves as the main protagonist in Walt Disney Animation Studios' 59th animated feature film Raya and the Last Dragon (2021). Created by screenwriter Adele Lim, she is voiced by American actress Kelly Marie Tran.

The daughter of the chief of the Heart tribe, Raya is a warrior princess who is appointed the guardian of the Dragon Gem. When the gem is broken into pieces, the plaque monsters known as the Druun are released to threaten the land of Kumandra and turn all the people, including Raya's father, into stones. She soon travels across Kumandra with the last remaining dragon, Sisu, and Tuk Tuk the pill bug/armadillo hybrid to retrieve the gem pieces and use its power to vanquish the Druun, while making friends along the way. Raya also rivals with Namaari, who is also the warrior princess from the Fang tribe.

Raya is considered the thirteenth official member of the Disney Princess line-up, and the first to come from a non-musical Disney Animated Canon film.

Development

Personality
Raya is a headstrong young woman who is mature and wisened for someone her age. She is a very capable person and is shown to easily adapt to situations around her. Despite her maturity, she retains a sense of humor and occasionally shows a bit of playfulness when such a moment presents itself. She deeply cares for her father and has a strong emotional attachment to certain people she considers her friends. Her biggest flaw is her inability to trust others. Except for Sisu, many of her new allies are immediately deemed suspicious or sinister in her eyes. Over time, she learns to overcome these issues and can see when someone is truly good. Raya is a very focused individual and is determined to see things through to the end.

Appearance
The character was animated by Adele Lim.

Voice
In the film, Raya is voiced by American actress Kelly Marie Tran.

Canadian actress, Cassie Steele was originally cast as the voice actress for Raya, however, due to creative changes involving the film's storyline, she eventually got replaced by Tran.

Characteristics

Appearances

Raya first appears in her youth, tested by her father for the role of the Guardian of the Dragon Gem, which gives the powers of Sisu and protects Heart from the Druun. She successfully passes and earns the title. Chief Benja invites the Tail, Talon, Spine, and Fang Lands to join in a feast. During the party, Raya befriends Princess Namaari of the Fang Land. They immediately bond and form a close friendship due to their shared interest in dragons. Namaari gives Raya a dragon-shaped pendant. In return, Raya reveals to Namaari the hidden location of the Dragon Gem, only to be ultimately betrayed by her. The other nations soon arrive at their location and fight over the orb. As a result, the Dragon Gem is shattered into five broken pieces and awakens the Druun. During the evacuation, Raya has trouble carrying her injured father to safety. Knowing they won't make it, Benja sacrifices himself to give Raya a piece of the orb and throws her off the bridge into the river below. As she falls, Raya is forced to watch her father get turned into a stone statue by the devouring plague and can only scream as the current drifts her away.

Six years later, Raya is venturing across the Tail Land, hoping to find Sisu, the last living dragon who can help her save Kumandra and restore her father. After searching from river to river, Raya comes across an old shipwreck at the very end of the land. She places offerings and succeeds in awakening the water dragon from her long slumber. Sisu agrees to help her find the remaining pieces of the Dragon Gem. Raya and Sisu travel on Tuk Tuk to the home of the Tail Land’s chief. Raya successfully avoids all the traps placed within and carefully removes a gem piece from the remains of the chief, who died to her own traps. Namaari arrives with her army, and the trio quickly escapes to a boat called "The Shrimporium", owned by a boy named Boun. The group then heads to the Talon Land.

Arriving at Talon, Raya encounters a "con-baby" named Noi and her Ongis, who steal the gem fragments. She chases the thieves throughout the market and eventually catches up to them. With their help, Raya is able to infiltrate the home of Talon’s chief, Dang Hu. She accidentally mistakes him for another person and finds out he is already long gone, with a new chief in his place. The new chief tricks Sisu to be stuck with the Drunn if she does not reveal the location of the other Dragon Gem pieces. Raya arrives on the scene, snatches a gem piece from the chief, and rescues Sisu. They returned to Boun’s boat with Noi and her Onjis and headed to the Spine Land.

At the Spine Land, Raya and Sisu are captured by a formidable giant named Tong, the lone survivor of his people. When Namaari and her army arrive at the front gates, Raya pleads with Tong to take her friends to safety while she buys them time with the enemies. Her friends follow the plan while she fights Namaari. The Fang princess gains the upper hand during the fight and is about to finish Raya until Sisu jumps in and saves her life.

Raya finally reveals Sisu's secret to her friends back on the boat, and they agree to work together to get the final piece of the Dragon Gem from the Fang Land. Raya originally plans for the team to sneakily infiltrate the kingdom, but she is persuaded to follow Sisu's plan of befriending Namaari. She decides to return Namaari's pendant as a gift and tells her to secretly meet her in the forest via letter. For the night, Raya shares a meal with all of her friends.

The next morning, Namaari meets with Raya as promised and presents the final piece of the Dragon Gem, but is betrayed again when her old friend pulls out a crossbow. Raya is unable to stop Namaari from firing an arrow at Sisu, killing her. Blinded by rage, Raya heads to Fang alone and confronts Namaari. Upon defeating her, Raya realizes her rage and lack of trust caused chaos in Kumandra and Sisu's death. Instead, she spares Namaari's life and leaves to help her friends evacuate Fang's citizens away from the Druun. With the gem's pieces starting to lose power and the Druun spreading closer, Raya decides to take the first step. She gives her gem piece to Namaari and turns into stone. Her friends do the same and turn into stone beside Raya. Namaari makes a choice to put all the pieces together before becoming petrified as well. After the Dragon Gem regains its power, Raya and all the infected victims are brought back to life. With Sisu and the dragons restored to Kumandra, Raya hugs her friends before returning home.

Arriving back at the Heart Land, Raya reunites with her father, and the two celebrate with the other nations, as Kumandra is united again.

In other media

Video games

Reception and legacy

Critical response

Accolades

Cultural impact
In September 2021, Raya made her official Disney Parks debut at Shanghai Disneyland's Happy Circle selfie spot. Beginning with the Lunar New Year Celebration in 2022, Raya made her North American debut at Disney California Adventure near the Redwood Creek play area. A doll version of Raya was added in 2022 as part of the new It's a Small World finale, accompanied by a light structure of Sisu.

References

Walt Disney Animation Studios characters
Female characters in animated films
Film characters introduced in 2021
Fictional female martial artists
Fictional princesses
Fictional Southeast Asian people
Fictional stick-fighters
Fictional flexible weapons practitioners
Fictional female swordfighters
Fictional swordfighters in films
Fictional women soldiers and warriors